Akyol is a Turkish surname. Notable people with the surname include:

 Cenk Akyol (born 1987), Turkish basketball player
 Cigdem Akyol (born 1978), German journalist
 Mustafa Akyol (born 1972), Turkish journalist
 Gaye Su Akyol (born 1985), Turkish singer and bandleader
 Taner Akyol (born 1977), Turkish saz (musical instrument) or bağlama player and classical composer
 Türkan Akyol (1928–2017), Turkish physician, academic and first female government minister of Turkey

See also
 Akyol, Silvan

Turkish-language surnames